Robert "Bob" Davies (born 1863) was a Welsh footballer who played as a wing half for Druids in the 1880s and made one appearance for Wales in 1885.

Football career
Davies was born in Cefn Mawr, near Ruabon, and was the eldest of five brothers who played for Druids. Described as "a keen competitor and a tough tackler", he helped Druids reach the final of the Welsh Cup in 1884, losing 1–0 to Oswestry White Stars after a replay. The following year, the clubs met again in the final with Druids winning this time 3–1, again after a replay.

He made his solitary international appearance against England in 1885. The match was played at Leamington Road, Blackburn on 14 March and ended in a 1–1 draw, with the English performance described as "disappointing".

After leaving the Druids in 1886, Davies moved to Manchester where he briefly played for Ardwick and later Rossendale.

Career outside football
Davies was killed in action during the First World War.

Family
Three of his brothers also played for Wales: Joe (7 appearances), Lloyd (16 appearances) and Thomas (4 appearances).

Honours
Druids
Welsh Cup winners: 1885
Welsh Cup finalists: 1884

References

External links

1863 births
1910s deaths
Year of death uncertain
People from Ruabon
Sportspeople from Wrexham County Borough
Welsh footballers
Wales international footballers
Association football wing halves
Druids F.C. players
Manchester City F.C. players
Rossendale United F.C. players
British military personnel killed in World War I